In the alcoholic beverages industry, congeners are substances, other than the desired type of alcohol, ethanol, produced during fermentation. These substances include small amounts of chemicals such as methanol and other alcohols (known as fusel alcohols), acetone, acetaldehyde, esters, tannins, and aldehydes (e.g. furfural). Congeners are responsible for most of the taste and aroma of distilled alcoholic beverages, and contribute to the taste of non-distilled drinks. It has been suggested that these substances contribute to the symptoms of a hangover. Brandy, rum and red wine have the highest amount of congeners, while vodka and beer have the least.

Congeners are the basis of alcohol congener analysis, a sub-discipline of forensic toxicology which determines what a person drank.

There is some evidence that high-congener drinks induce more severe hangovers, but the effect is not well studied and is still secondary to the total amount of ethanol consumed.

See also
 Alcohol (drug)
 Alcohol congener analysis
 Wine chemistry

References

External links

Relationships of Sweetness in Lager to Selected Volatile Congeners

Alcohol chemistry
Taste modifiers